USCGC Agassiz (WSC-126) later WMEC-126, was a steel hulled, single screw  of the United States Coast Guard which served between 1927 and 1969.

Design 
USCGC Agassiz (WSC-126) was the second of 35 ships in the Active class, designed to serve as a "mother ship" in support of Prohibition against bootleggers and smugglers along the coasts. These ships would shadow and pursue large smuggling vessels away from American shores. They were meant to be able to stay at sea for long periods of time in any kinds of weather, and were able to expand berthing space via hammocks of the need arises, such as if a large amount of survivors were on board.

She was built by the American Brown Boveri Electric Corporation of Camden, New Jersey at a cost of $63,163. The cutter was laid down on 24 July 1926 as yard number 321 and launched on 30 November 1926 from slipway L. The ship was commissioned on 12 January 1927. A single  gun was mounted as the offensive weapon as launch.

Agassiz was named for Jean Louis Rodolphe Agassiz, a paleontologist, glaciologist, geologist and naturalist who taught at the University of Neuchâtel, Switzerland and Harvard University, Massachusetts.

Ship history 
After being commissioned on 12 January 1927, Agassiz was stationed at Boston apart of Division One, Squadron One of the Offshore Patrol Force, Boston with five other cutters. On 1 August 1933 the ship operated from Fernandina, Florida apart of the Jacksonville Division. In 1936 she was attached to Curtis Bay, Maryland, and during 1940 she operated out of Charleston, South Carolina. She was assigned to the Caribbean Sea Frontier [CARIBSEAFRON] during the Second World War. On 12 March 1942 the cutter saved 11 survivors from the torpedoed tanker . Once the war ended the vessel was sent to Morehead City, North Carolina until 1956. The homeport was changed to Cape May, New Jersey in 1956. The ship was redesignated from WSC, Cost Guard Submarine Chaser, to WMEC-126, Coast Guard Medium Endurance Cutter. The grounded Septic Nerve was aided by Agassiz off Little Egg Inlet on 18 October 1961.

The Agassiz was decommissioned and struck from Coast Guard service on 13 October 1969 and was transferred to the United States Merchant Marine Academy on 16 October 1969 as the vessel Agassiz #607283. The ship's fate after being transferred is unknown.

References

Active-class patrol boats
1926 ships
Ships built in Camden, New Jersey
Brown, Boveri & Cie